Nayland Moll (born c. 1933) is a former Canadian football player who played for the Toronto Argonauts and Ottawa Rough Riders.

References

Living people
1930s births
Canadian football running backs
Toronto Argonauts players
Ottawa Rough Riders players